Lucinda Finley is the Frank G. Raichle Professor of Trial and Appellate Advocacy at the University at Buffalo.

Biography
She has a 1980 J.D. from Columbia University School of Law, and a 1977 B.A. from Barnard College. Prior to joining the Buffalo law faculty, she was on the Yale Law School faculty, and she has also been a visiting professor at the University of Sydney Law School in Australia and an adjunct professor at Cornell Law School. In 1999, she was the distinguished visiting professor at DePaul University Law School in Chicago.

She was additionally appointed vice provost for faculty affairs in February 2005, a position she held until 2014.

Books published
She is the author of two books:
 Tort Law and Practice (with D. Vetri, L. Levine, and J. Vogel) (LexisNexis/Matthew Bender, 3rd edition, 2006)
 Tort Law and Practice (with D. Vetri, L. Levine, and J. Vogel) (LexisNexis/Matthew Bender, 2nd edition, 2003)

References

External links
University of Buffalo Online Directory: L. M. Finley

Living people
American lawyers
American women lawyers
University at Buffalo faculty
Barnard College alumni
Columbia Law School alumni
Year of birth missing (living people)
American women academics
21st-century American women